

About ARGOsearch 
ARGOsearch allows users to search within recordings such as audio recordings, call notes, transcriptions, and meta-data, for key information—including spoken words, phone numbers, and dates.

ARGOsearch is a spin-off from Calltrunk—a cloud-based call recording and call management business that provides services to consumers, SMBs, and large enterprises. ARGOsearch was developed on Calltrunk's OpenVoice Platform.

How it works 
The ARGOsearch software is available on computers and mobile devices, enabling users to record phone calls and search them for verbal information.

Subscribers store spoken data from mobiles, landlines, Skype, or a Dictaphone, and upload them into an online storage bank. They can then search the recorded conversations for dates, times, words, or phrases. ARGOsearch's word indexation accuracy is around 80%.

ARGOsearch enables individuals and small companies to capture, store and search conversations,  in the way that large companies already can in-house.

ArgoSearch is currently free, though an OP3Nvoice spokesman said the company would eventually charge for it. It works in Web browsers and on iPhone, and Android phones.

ARGOsearch is available in beta across the US, UK and, Australia.

References

External links

ARGOsearch Official Website
Calltrunk Official Website
OP3Nvoice Official Website

Telephony
Software companies of the United Kingdom